At the Mercy of Inspiration was a heavy metal band from Toronto.

History
At the Mercy of Inspiration was formed in 2000 by Tom Piraino (bass), Jett Janczak (drums), vocalists Andre Zadorozny and guitarists Greg Gallagher and Scott Middleton. Piraino had previously played in Left Behind, SeventyEightDays, Dropping Bombs and Funerary. On December 27, 2000, they recorded a two-song demo cassette, Twolovesongsfortheroad.  On May 11, 2001, they recorded a second two-song demo, The Fatality of Beauty.

Gallagher and Piraino then left the band; Piraino went on to join the band Cursed. Bassist Terry Clemente joined but quickly left and was replaced by former Jude the Obscure bassist Chuck Leach. Gallagher was replaced by guitarist Jesse O'Hara. Leach then left and was replaced by bassist Mario Bozza. In 2002, they released the seven-song EP A Perfect Way to Kill an Evening.

The band played live in Ontario and Quebec with The End and A Day and a Deathwish, and toured eastern Canada with Alexisonfire, Hollow and Jersey. In 2004, they released the four-song EP Gone Are the Days.

In 2004, the band broke up. Scott Middleton then founded the band Cancer Bats. Leach would later join The Artist Life, while O'Hara played in the band Sun Satellite.

Releases
2000: Twolovesongsfortheroad (2-song demo cassette)
2001: The Fatality of Beauty (2-song demo cassette)
2002: A Perfect Way to Kill an Evening (EP)
2004: Gone Are the Days (EP)

References

External links
At the Mercy of Inspiration on Myspace
At the Mercy of Inspiration on Encyclopaedia Metallum
At the Mercy of Inspiration on Last FM

Musical groups established in 2000
Musical groups disestablished in 2004
Musical groups from Toronto
Canadian heavy metal musical groups
2000 establishments in Ontario
2004 disestablishments in Ontario